The areíto was a performance and ceremony of the Taíno people of the Caribbean.

Areíto, areito or areyto may also refer to:

Areíto (album), an album by Juan Luis Guerra
Areito (record label), a Cuban record label
Areyto (EP), an EP by Puya